Leonid Shvetsov (born 28 March 1969) is a Russian long-distance runner. He competed in the men's marathon at the 1996 Summer Olympics and the 2004 Summer Olympics. He also held the record for the fastest time at Walt Disney World Marathon since 1995 at a time of 2:11:50.

References

1969 births
Living people
Athletes (track and field) at the 1996 Summer Olympics
Athletes (track and field) at the 2004 Summer Olympics
Russian male long-distance runners
Russian male marathon runners
Olympic athletes of Russia
Place of birth missing (living people)